Hadrotettix is a genus of band-winged grasshoppers in the family Acrididae. There are at least four described species in Hadrotettix.

Species
These four species belong to the genus Hadrotettix:
 Hadrotettix magnificus (Rehn, 1907) (magnificent grasshopper)
 Hadrotettix nebulosus Scudder, 1900
 Hadrotettix scotodes Otte, 1984
 Hadrotettix trifasciatus (Say, 1828) (three-banded grasshopper)

References

Further reading

External links

 

Oedipodinae
Articles created by Qbugbot